The Girl Without Pyjamas is a 1957 West German comedy film directed by Hans Quest and starring Ingeborg Christiansen, Bert Fortell and Elma Karlowa.

Cast
 Ingeborg Christiansen as Irma
 Bert Fortell as Eddy Blohm
 Elma Karlowa as Eva
 Bum Krüger as Egon Bruchsal
 Christiane Maybach as Marion Klenk
 Gunther Philipp as Dr. Engelbert Moll
 Willi Rose
 Oskar Sima as Direktor Klenk
 Alice Treff as Frau Schickedanz
 Erika von Thellmann as Tante Wilhelmine
 Charlotte Witthauer as Fräulein Rübsahm
 Wolfgang Völz as Assistant von Dr. Moll

References

Bibliography 
 Horst O. Hermanni. Das Film ABC Band 5: Von La Jana bis Robert Mulligan.

External links 
 

1957 films
West German films
German comedy films
1957 comedy films
1950s German-language films
Films directed by Hans Quest
Constantin Film films
1950s German films